Evergreen is an unincorporated community in Ross Township, Allegheny County, Pennsylvania, United States.

Notable person
Henry Huber, Wisconsin politician

Notes

Unincorporated communities in Allegheny County, Pennsylvania
Unincorporated communities in Pennsylvania